Major-General Nigel William Fairbairn Richards CB CBE (15 August 1945 – 21 November 2019) was a British Army officer who commanded 4th Division.

Military career
Educated at Peterhouse, Cambridge, Richards was commissioned into the Royal Artillery in 1965. He was given command of 7th Regiment Royal Horse Artillery in 1983. He was appointed Commander of 5th Airborne Brigade in 1989, Director of Army Staff Duties at the Ministry of Defence in 1991 and Chief of Combat Support for the Allied Rapid Reaction Corps in 1994 during the Bosnian War. His last appointment was as General Officer Commanding 4th Division in 1996 before he retired in 1998.

He died on 21 November 2019 at the age of 74.

References

1945 births
2019 deaths
British Army generals
Companions of the Order of the Bath
Commanders of the Order of the British Empire
Royal Artillery officers
Alumni of Peterhouse, Cambridge